Sago  is an unincorporated community in Upshur County, West Virginia, United States. It is located along the Buckhannon River and is the site of the Sago Mine, scene of the 2006 Sago Mine disaster.

Also located in Sago is the Sago Baptist Church, shown repeatedly by the international media during the Sago Mine accident relief effort as it served as the site of family briefings and vigils.

The community was named by a cattleman for unknown reasons.

Gallery

References

External links
History Of The Sago Community

Unincorporated communities in Upshur County, West Virginia
Unincorporated communities in West Virginia
Mining communities in West Virginia
Coal towns in West Virginia